Walter Pfeiffer (born in Beggingen in 1946) is a Swiss artist.

Life and career

Walter Pfeiffer was born in Beggingen (Switzerland), in 1946 and has been producing since the early 1970s. His portraits of friends, lovers and the youth surrounding him in cities such as Zurich, Paris and New York would link him to other photographers of that decade, such as Nan Goldin and Nobuyoshi Araki. His first book of photographs appeared in 1980, Walter Pfeiffer: 1970-1980 (Elke Betzel, 1980). The next two decades were spent in relative obscurity, while the photographer kept on producing his photography and a few videos, while at the same time returning to painting. The breakthrough and rediscovery of his work would have to wait until the beginning of the century, when Welcome Aboard, Photographs 1980-2000 (Edition Patrick Frey/Scab, 2001) was published.  His work was then linked to the revival of realistic photography in the 1990s and early 2000s, with artists such as Wolfgang Tillmans, Ryan McGinley, Slava Mogutin, Heinz Peter Knes and Jack Pierson. His influence on the work of photographers like Juergen Teller has been noted. Since then, Walter Pfeiffer has collaborated with international magazines as diverse in style and audience as i-D, Butt and Vogue.

Artist Rep agency Art + Commerce represents Walter Pfeiffer for image licensing and advertising.

Publications

His first book of photographs, Walter Pfeiffer: 1970-1980, was published in 1980, followed a few years later by The eyes, the thoughts, ceaselessly wandering (Nachbar der Welt, 1986), but raised little attention. His work would only garner an international audience after the publication of Welcome Aboard, Photographs 1980-2000, in 2001. Since then, three new books have followed, released by international publishing houses such as Hatje Cantz and Steidl, including Night and Day (Hatje Cantz, 2007), Walter Pfeiffer: In Love with Beauty (Steidl, 2009) and Cherchez la femme!, also in 2009.

Exhibitions

Exhibitions of Walter Pfeiffer's photography have multiplied considerably in the past decade, due in part to his collaborations with magazines such as i-D and Vogue, but also the publications of his books by Hatje Cantz and other international publishers. In the past few years, his most important shows were in New York City and Paris, in galleries such as Galerie Baumet Sultana (Paris), Team Gallery and Anna Kustera (New York).

Models

Walter Pfeiffer has stated in interviews that he prefers to work with non-professionals. His casting is usually done by himself, friends and a few assistants, often approaching subjects in the street. However, in the past few years, due to his work in the fashion industry, Pfeiffer has also photographed professional models such as Cara Delevingne, Karlie Kloss, Magdalena Frackowiak, Eva Herzigová, Francisco Lachowski and Lorcan Leather-Barrow.

Books

 Walter Pfeiffer: 1970-1980 (Elke Betzel, 1980).
 The eyes, the thoughts, ceaselessly wandering (Nachbar der Welt, 1986).
 Welcome Aboard, Photographs 1980-2000 (Edition Patrick Frey/Scab, 2001).
 Night and Day (Hatje Cantz, 2007).
 Walter Pfeiffer: In Love with Beauty (Steidl, 2009).
 Cherchez la femme! (2009).

References

External links
 
Official website
Article and interview on Interview Magazine
Article on Artforum International
Collaborator page on i-D magazine 
Walter Pfeiffer´s 2009 photoshoot with Magdalena Frackowiak 
Walter Pfeiffer´s Portfolio at Art + Commerce

Swiss photographers
Swiss contemporary artists
Living people
1946 births